The Amman Filmmakers Cooperative  promotes independent Jordanian and Palestinian Diaspora filmmaking through training, experimentation, and networking. The Cooperative seeks to empower student filmmakers to produce films using very nominal resources and with the help of digital filmmaking tools. The Cooperative also manages the Jordan Short Film Festival, an art film festival established in 2004.

Overview
Founded in 2002 by Palestinian diaspora filmmaker Hazim M. Bitar, The Amman Filmmakers Cooperative (AFC) began as a social network of cinema aficionados in Jordan. In 2003, the Cooperative started offering free filmmaking workshops and production support to independent filmmakers.

Community Initiatives
In 2007 the Cooperative and the Spanish Embassy in Jordan worked together to launch Hope Films, a project that organizes workshops for disadvantaged Jordanian communities including Palestinian refugee camps. and the Jordan Short Film Festival

External links
  The Amman Filmmakers Cooperative website

References

Film schools in Jordan
Palestinian artists
Palestinian film directors
Filmmaker cooperatives
Mass media in Amman
Jordanian artists
Cooperatives in Jordan